Eduard Voss (1884 - 1974) was a German entomologist, who specialized in beetles (Coleoptera), in particular the weevil family (Curculionidae). He described many new species and a number of beetles are named after him. Much of his beetle collection was lost in World War II, but some of the remaining collection is held in the Zoologischs Museum Hamburg.

Some taxa named by him
Apion subdiscedens
Euops tibialis
Euops viridiceps
Pseudomesitodes

Selected publications
Voss, E. 1922. Indo-Malayische Rhynchitinen (Curculionidae). I. Philippine journal of science 21(4), 385–415.
Voss, E. 1922. Neue Rüsselkäfer aus verschiedenen Erdteilen. Deutsche entomologische Zeitschrift 1922: 166–174 .
Voss, E. 1922. Kurze Bemerkungen über Rüsselkäfer. Deutsche entomologische Zeitschrift 1922: 174 .
Voss, E. 1922. Sauter's Formosa-Ausbeute: Curculionidae: Rhynchitinae (Col.). (4. Beitrag zur Kenntnis der Curculioniden.). Archiv für Naturgeschichte 87 (A) (11) [1921]: 277–286.

Voss, E. 1970: Attelabidae, Curculionidae. (Ergebnisse des Forschungsunternehmens Nepal Himalaya). Nachtrag. Khumbu Himal, 3(3): 444–456.
Voss, E. (1971) Beschreibung von vier Cossoninen, nebst je einer Gattung und Untergattung (Col., Curc.). (Beitrag 209 zur Kenntnis der Curculioniden). Entomologische Mitteilungen aus dem Zoologischen Museum Hamburg, 4(74), 195–200.
Voss, E (1974) Coleoptera: Curculionidae partim. South African Animal Life, 15: 395–479.

References 

German entomologists
1884 births

1974 deaths